The Political Tinker (Danish: Den politiske kandestøber) is a five-set satirical play published by Norwegian-Danish playwright Ludvig Holberg in 1722.

Production history
It premiered at Lille Grønnegade Theatre in Copenhagen on 25 September 1722. It premiere at the Royal Danish Theatre was on 13 February 1750.

Themes
The play was his first comedy. The play theme is from recent political incidents in Hamburg, Germany. Holberg ridicules the political involvement of a group of craftsmen. Some interpreters see a clear anti-democratic tendency in the play, but there is also ambiguity in the way the story of class conflicts and political rebellion is told.

English translations

References

External links

"Den Politiske Kandstøber. Comœdie"
 Source

Plays by Ludvig Holberg
1722 plays